Wassily Sapellnikoff (tr. Vasily Lvovich Sapelnikov) (17 March 1941), was a Ukrainian pianist.

Biography
Sapellnikoff was born in Odessa.  He studied at the Odessa Conservatory under Louis Brassin and Sophie Menter, and became professor of piano at Moscow Conservatory in 1897.  He eventually moved to Leipzig and finally settled in Munich.

He toured with Pyotr Ilyich Tchaikovsky in Germany, France and England.  At his debut in Hamburg in 1888, he played Tchaikovsky's Piano Concerto No. 1 in B-flat minor with the composer conducting.  This concert was a great success and a catalyst for his budding career as a concert pianist in Western Europe. He was the first to play this concerto in England.  He was the dedicatee of a piano piece by Tchaikovsky.

Tchaikovsky wrote about him affectionately in his letters to his brother Modest, in terms such as:

{{Blockquote|Since the time of Kotek I have never loved anyone so warmly as him.|author=|title=|source=}}

Because they spent so much time together on these tours, it is often asserted that he and Tchaikovsky were lovers.  However, Alexander Poznansky, in Tchaikovsky: The Quest for the Inner Man'', writes: "As in the case of Brandukov, it seems likely that an erotic element was present in Tchaikovsky's friendship with Sapelnikov and that he recognised it as such.  Both men were quite young and good-looking.  Almost certainly, however, their relations remained chaste."

Sapellnikoff first appeared in England in 1889 playing the Tchaikovsky concerto at a Royal Philharmonic Society concert, under the composer's baton. He became a favourite at Philharmonic concerts, and created a furore in 1892 by his performance of Franz Liszt's E-flat Concerto, accepting a second engagement for the same season.  In 1902 he delivered the first performance in England of Sergei Rachmaninoff's 2nd Piano Concerto. In December 1912 he gave Frédéric Chopin's E minor Concerto, under Percy Pitt: in January 1914 the Rachmaninoff again, under Willem Mengelberg: in November 1914 the Liszt A major Concerto, under Thomas Beecham, a performance repeated in January 1915; and the Second Suite by Rachmaninoff (for two pianofortes) with Simeon Rumschisky in December 1915. He performed the Rachmaninoff concerto again for the RPO with Landon Ronald in January 1923.

In England he amazed George Bernard Shaw with his playing of the octave left-hand passages in Chopin's Polonaise in A-flat Heroic.  Shaw referred to his left-hand playing as "a marvel even among right hands for delicacy of touch and independence and swiftness of action".

Between 1897 and 1899 he was a professor at the Moscow Conservatory, where his students included Nikolai Medtner.
On 1 December 1905 Sapellnikoff recorded 12 pieces for the reproducing piano Welte-Mignon, six from his own works. He also made various gramophone records for the Vocalion label, and recorded the 2nd Piano Concerto of Rachmaninoff for Decca Records in 1929 under Basil Cameron, though this recording was never issued and is thought now to be lost.

He died in San Remo, Italy.

Notes and references

Sources
Eric Blom, ed., Grove Dictionary of Music and Musicians, 5th edition, reprinted 1966

External links
 

Russian classical pianists
Male classical pianists
1867 births
1941 deaths
Musicians from Odesa
Honorary Members of the Royal Philharmonic Society
Russian music educators
Piano pedagogues
Russian Christians
White Russian emigrants to Italy